The Perris Elementary School District is the organization responsible for the administration of public elementary schools (K-6) in the city of Perris, California in the United States. The district currently administers 8 elementary schools.

The district is administered by a superintendent and a five-member school board.

Schools
Clearwater Elementary School 
Enchanted Hills Elementary School
Good Hope Elementary School
Innovative Horizons Charter School at Nan Sanders
Palms Elementary School
Perris Elementary School
Railway Elementary School
Sky View Elementary School
Rob Reiner Development Center

References

External links
 

Perris, California
School districts in Riverside County, California